Isobars are atoms (nuclides) of different chemical elements that have the same number of nucleons. Correspondingly, isobars differ in atomic number (or number of protons) but have the same mass number. An example of a series of isobars is 40S, 40Cl, 40Ar, 40K, and 40Ca. While the nuclei of these nuclides all contain 40 nucleons, they contain varying numbers of protons and neutrons.

The term "isobars" (originally "isobares") for nuclides was suggested by Alfred Walter Stewart in 1918. It is derived from the Greek word isos, meaning "equal" and baros, meaning "weight".

Mass 
The same mass number implies neither the same mass of nuclei, nor equal atomic masses of corresponding nuclides. From the Weizsäcker formula for the mass of a nucleus:
 
This explains that beta decay is energetically favorable for neutron-rich nuclides, and positron decay is favorable for strongly neutron-deficient nuclides. Both decay modes do not change the mass number, hence an original nucleus and its daughter nucleus are isobars. In both aforementioned cases, a heavier nucleus decays to its lighter isobar.

For even  the  term has the form:

where  is another constant. This term, subtracted from the mass expression above, is positive for even-even nuclei and negative for odd-odd nuclei. This means that even-even nuclei, which do not have a strong neutron excess or neutron deficiency, have higher binding energy than their odd-odd isobar neighbors. It implies that even-even nuclei are (relatively) lighter and more stable. The difference is especially strong for small . This effect is also predicted (qualitatively) by other nuclear models and has important consequences.

Stability 
The Mattauch isobar rule states that if two adjacent elements on the periodic table have isotopes of the same mass number, at least one of these isobars must be a radionuclide (radioactive). In cases of three isobars of sequential elements where the first and last are stable (this is often the case for even-even nuclides, see above), branched decay of the middle isobar may occur. For instance, radioactive iodine-126 has almost equal probabilities for two decay modes: positron emission, leading to tellurium-126, and beta emission, leading to xenon-126.

No observationally stable isobars exist for mass numbers 5 (decays to helium-4 plus a proton or neutron), 8 (decays to two helium-4 nuclei), 147, 151, as well as for 209 and above. Two observationally stable isobars exist for 36, 40, 46, 50, 54, 58, 64, 70, 74, 80, 84, 86, 92, 94, 96, 98, 102, 104, 106, 108, 110, 112, 114, 120, 122, 123, 124, 126, 132, 134, 136, 138, 142, 154, 156, 158, 160, 162, 164, 168, 170, 176, 192, 196, 198 and 204.

In theory, no two stable nuclides have the same mass number (since no two nuclides that have the same mass number are both stable to beta decay and double beta decay), and no stable nuclides exist for mass numbers 5, 8, 143–155, 160–162, and ≥ 165, since in theory, the beta-decay stable nuclides for these mass numbers can undergo alpha decay.

See also

 Isotopes (nuclides having the same number of protons)
 Isotones (nuclides having the same number of neutrons)
 Nuclear isomers (different excited states of the same nuclide)
 Magic number (physics)
 Electron capture

Bibliography

References

Nuclear physics